Tout Puissant Akwembe is a Gabonese football club based in Libreville. They play in the Gabon Championnat National D2.

Honours

Stadium
Currently the team plays at the 7000 capacity Stade Augustin Monédan de Sibang.

Performance in CAF competitions
2002 CAF Cup: second round (Round-of-16)

References

External links
Profile

Football clubs in Gabon
Football clubs in Libreville

es:TP Akwembé